Hersfeld-Rotenburg is a Kreis (district) in the east of Hesse, Germany. Neighboring districts are Werra-Meißner, Wartburgkreis, Fulda, Vogelsbergkreis, Schwalm-Eder.

History
In 1821, districts were created in Hesse, including the districts Hersfeld and Rotenburg, which stayed nearly unchanged (except a short period after the revolution of 1848, when they were dissolved) through the annexion of Hesse-Kassel (or Hesse-Cassel) by Prussia and the creation of the Hesse state. In 1972 both districts were merged into one.

Geography
The district contains the hilly landscape of Waldhessen, the mountains are of the Knüllgebirge, Stölzinger Gebirge, Richelsdorfer Gebirge and the Kuppenrhön, part of the Rhön mountains.

Coat of arms
The coat of arms is a combination of the two coat of arms of the precursor districts. The cross in the left half is taken from the old arms of the Hersfeld abbey; the linden branch is taken from the city arms of Rotenburg.

Towns and municipalities

Twin towns
 Działdowo, Poland
 Hyvinkää, Finland

References

External links

Official website 
Touristic website 

 
Districts of Hesse